97 Minutes is an upcoming action thriller starring Alec Baldwin, Jonathan Rhys Meyers and MyAnna Buring, directed by Timo Vuorensola and written by Pavan Grover.

Synopsis
A hijacked aeroplane has 97 minutes before it runs out of fuel.

Cast

Alec Baldwin
Jonathan Rhys Meyers
MyAnna Buring
Jo Martin
Michael Sirow
Pavan Grover
Anjul Nigam
Davor Tomic
Slavko Sobin
Luke J I Smith
Kasia Koleczek
Austin Parsons
Peter Brooke

Production
Baldwin was filming in Alton, Hampshire on 9 February 2022. Baldwin posted videos on his social media accounts to say "it was strange working again" after the death of cinematographer Halyna Hutchins on his previous film set Rust. On 16 February 2022 Jonathan Rhys Meyers and MyAnna Buring were announced as having joined the cast on the production at Black Hangar Studios, along with Jo Martin,  Michael Sirow, Anjul Nigam, Davor Tomic, Slavko Sobin, Luke J I Smith and Kasia Koleczek. Jamie R Thompson and Jake Seal from Orwo Studios are producing with Michael Arata, Jerry Daigle, Suraj Gohill, Avi Haas and Ford Corbett executive producing. Funding with Orwo are Origo Financial Services, with Orwo Film Distribution doing the international sales. Working from a script by Pavan Grover who is also co-producing, are director Timo Vuorensola and cinematographer Konstantin Freyer. Filming was wrapped after 18 days on two film sets. Grover said Baldwin had been attached for 18 months prior to the filming and the part had been tailored for him. Previously, William Hurt had been attached to the film. Grover had written the script whilst working as an anesthesiologist in Texas in 2009.

Release
Writer and co-producer Pavan Grover stated that 97 Minutes was being aimed for an early 2023 release.

References

External links
 

Films about hijackings
Films about aircraft hijackings
Films shot in Hampshire
Upcoming films